The Saulx is a 115 km long river in France, right tributary of the Marne. Its source is near the village Germisay. It flows generally northwest, through the following départements and towns:

Haute-Marne: Effincourt
Meuse: Montiers-sur-Saulx, Stainville
Marne: Sermaize-les-Bains, Pargny-sur-Saulx, Vitry-le-François

The Saulx flows into the Marne in Vitry-le-François. Its main tributaries are the Ornain and the Chée. The part of the Marne-Rhine Canal between Vitry-le-François and Sermaize-les-Bains runs parallel to the Saulx.

References

Rivers of France
Rivers of Grand Est
Rivers of Haute-Marne
Rivers of Meuse (department)
Rivers of Marne (department)
Grand Est region articles needing translation from French Wikipedia